The King of Uvea (titled as Lavelua) is the ruler of the polity of Uvea, the chiefdom (Royaume coutumier) located on Wallis Island. Uvea encompasses the whole island and the surrounding islets.

Wallis Island is part of the French overseas collectivity of Wallis and Futuna, in Oceania in the South Pacific Ocean.

First dynasty from Tu'i Tonga
This dynasty ruled approximately 1400–1600.

 Tauloko, 1st Hau of 'Uvea 1400–1426
 Ga'asialili, 2nd Hau of 'Uvea c. 1426 – c. 1456
 Havea Fakahau, 3rd Hau of 'Uvea c. 1456 – c. 1516
 Talapili, joint 4th Hau of 'Uvea, from c. 1516
 Talamohe, joint 5th Hau of 'Uvea, to c. 1565
 Fakahega, 6th Hau of 'Uvea c. 1565–1588
 Siulano, 7th Hau of 'Uvea 1588–1600, died 1600.

First Takumasiva dynasty
This dynasty ruled approximately 1600–1660.

 Takumasiva
 Pou
 Fatualoamanogi
 Emmunimaufenua
 Fakataulavelua
 Filikekai

Vehi'ika dynasty
This dynasty ruled approximately 1660–1780.

 Vehi'ika, 14th Hau of 'Uvea 
 Filisika, 15th Hau of 'Uvea
 Kafoa Logologofolau, 16th Hau of 'Uvea
 Munigoto, 17th Hau of 'Uvea
 Galu Atuvaha, 18th Hau of 'Uvea, to 1726
 Galu Fanalua, 19th Hau of 'Uvea 1726–1756
 Galu Vaivaikava, joint 20th Hau of 'Uvea 1756–1768 or 1756–1780
 Kafoka Finekata, joint 21st Hau of 'Uvea 1768–1780 or 1756–1780

Second Takumasiva dynasty
This dynasty ruled approximately 1780–1810.

 Manuka (1780–1810)
 Tufele I (1810–1810) assassinated in 1810

Kulitea dynasty
This dynasty ruled approximately 1810–1820.

 Kulitea (1810–1819)
 Lavekava (joint 1819–1820)
 Hiva (joint 1819–1820) assassinated in 1820

Third Takumasiva dynasty
The present dynasty gained the throne in 1820.

 Muliakaaka (1820–1825)
 Uhila "Moafa" (1825)
 Toifale (fem.) (1825)
 Mulitoto (1825–1826)
 Soane-Patita Vaimua Lavelua (1826–1829) (1st time)
 Takala (1829–1830)
 Soane-Patita Vaimua Lavelua (1830–1858) (2nd time)
 Falakika Seilala (fem.) (1858–1869)
 Amelia Tokagahahau Aliki (fem.) (1869–1895)
 Vito Lavelua II (1895–1904)
 Isaake (11 March 1895 – 12 March 1895) (in rebellion)
 Lusiano Aisake (1904–1906)
 Sosefo Mautāmakia I "Tokila" (1906 – 1 April 1910) (1st time)
 Soane-Patita Lavuia (1910–1916)
 Sosefo Mautāmakia II (1916–1918)
 Vitolo Kulihaapai (1918–1924)
 Tomasi Kulimoetoke I (1924–1928)
 Mikaele Tufele II (1928–1931) (1st time)
 Sosefo Mautāmakia I "Tokila" (1931–1933) (2nd time)
 Petelo Kahofuna (13 March 1933 – 25 May 1933)
 Mikaele Tufele II (2nd time) (25 May 1933 – 30 November 1933) (2nd time)
 Council of Ministers (30 November 1933 – 16 March 1941)
 Leone Mahikitoga (16 March 1941 – 29 March 1947)
 Pelenato Fuluhea "Pulufegu" (1947–1950)
 Kapeliele Tufele III "Setu" (1950–1953)
 Council of Ministers (17 November 1953 – 18 December 1953)
 Soane Toke (18 December 1953 – 19 December 1953)
 Aloisia Brial (née Tautuu) (fem.) (22 December 1953 – 12 September 1958)
 Council of Ministers (12 September 1958 – 12 March 1959)
 Tomasi Kulimoetoke II (12 March 1959 – 7 May 2007)
 Council of Ministers (8 May 2007 – 25 July 2008)
 Kapeliele Faupala (25 July 2008 – 2 September 2014)
 Council of Ministers (2 September 2014 – 16 April 2016)
 Felice Tominiko Halagahu (co-claimant, 16 April 2016 – 3 June 2016)
 Patalione Kanimoa (co-claimant, 17 April/3 June 2016 – present)

See also
 List of kings of Alo
 List of kings of Sigave

Notes

References

Sources
 'Uvea mo Futuna: http://www.uvea-mo-futuna.com/article.php3?id_article=87

Uvea